Robert Edward Mulvee (February 15, 1930December 28, 2018) was an American prelate of the Roman Catholic Church. 

Mulvee served as an auxiliary bishop of the Diocese of Manchester in New Hampshire (1977-1985), as bishop of the Diocese of Wilmington in Delaware (1985–1995) and as bishop of the Diocese of Providence in Rhode Island (1997–2005).

Biography

Early life 
Robert Mulvee was born on February 15, 1930, in Boston, Massachusetts, to John F. and Jennie T. Mulvee. He studied at St. Thomas Seminary in Bloomfield, Connecticut; Saint Paul University in Ottawa, Ontario; and the American College of the Immaculate Conception in Leuven, Belgium.

Priesthood 
Mulvee was ordained into the priesthood by Archbishop Henry Joseph O’Brien for the Diocese of Manchester in Leuven on June 30, 1957.

Mulvee did pastoral work for several years before furthering his studies in Europe, earning a Doctorate of Canon Law from the Pontifical Lateran University in Rome (1964) and a Master of Religious Education degree from the Catholic University of Louvain in Belgium Following his return to New Hampshire, Mulvee was named assistant chancellor of the diocese and in 1966 a papal chamberlain by the Vatican

Auxiliary Bishop of Manchester 
On February 15, 1977, Mulvee was appointed as the first auxiliary bishop of the Diocese of Manchester and titular bishop of Summa by Pope Paul VI. While in Manchester, Mulvee stayed as a guest at Saint Anselm Abbey in Goffstown. He received his episcopal consecration on April 14, 1977, from Bishop Odore Gendron, with Bishops Ernest Primeau and John Hackett serving as co-consecrators.

Bishop of Wilmington 
After the death of Bishop Thomas Mardaga, Pope John Paul II named Mulvee as the seventh bishop of the Diocese of Wilmington on February 19, 1985. 

During his tenure as bishop of Wilmington, Mulvee emphasized collegiality in his administration of the diocese, helped restructure the Delmarva Ecumenical Agency into the Christian Council of Delaware and Maryland's Eastern Shore, and founded three new missions and raised a fourth to parish status.

Coadjutor Bishop and Bishop of Providence 
John Paul II appointed Mulvee as coadjutor bishop of the Diocese of Providence on February 9, 1995.  He succeeded Bishop Louis Gelineau upon the latter's resignation on June 11, 1997.

On September 10, 2002, Mulvee announced a $13.5 million settlement of 36 victim lawsuits involving sexual abuse by 11 priests and one nun from the diocese.  This settlement ended a ten-year dispute over sexual abuse claims between victims and the diocese.  Mulvee made this statement:I reach out with deep sadness to the victims. Certainly in the name of the church, I ask their forgiveness and offer an apology for the harm that has been done to them.

Retirement and legacy 
Upon reaching the mandatory retirement age of 75, Mulvee submitted his letter of resignation to John Paul II on February 15, 2005. His resignation was accepted on March 31, 2005, and Bishop Thomas Tobin was appointed his successor. Mulvee served as apostolic administrator of the diocese until Tobin's installation on May 31, 2006.

On December 28, 2018, Robert Mulvee died at age 88 at St. Antoine Residence in North Smithfield. Rhode Island.  Mulvee was buried at  St. Ann Cemetery in Cranston, Rhode Island.

See also
 Catholic Church hierarchy
 Catholic Church in the United States
 Historical list of the Catholic bishops of the United States
 List of Catholic bishops of the United States
 Lists of patriarchs, archbishops, and bishops

References

External links 
Roman Catholic Diocese of Providence Official Site
Official site of the Holy See

Episcopal succession

1930 births
2018 deaths
St. Thomas Seminary alumni
Clergy from Boston
Roman Catholic bishops of Providence
Roman Catholic bishops of Wilmington
20th-century Roman Catholic bishops in the United States
21st-century Roman Catholic bishops in the United States
Catholic University of Leuven (1834–1968) alumni
American College of the Immaculate Conception alumni
Roman Catholic Diocese of Manchester